Deborah La Mia Denaver is an American make-up artist. She was nominated for an Academy Award in the category Best Makeup and Hairstyling for the film Ghosts of Mississippi.

Selected filmography 
 Ghosts of Mississippi (1996; co-nominated with Matthew W. Mungle)

References

External links 

Living people
Year of birth missing (living people)
Place of birth missing (living people)
American make-up artists